The Freightliner C2 is a Type C conventional bus chassis manufactured by Daimler Truck North America, used for school bus applications.  It was introduced in 2004 as the replacement for the FS-65.  The C2 uses the hood, firewall, steering column, and dashboard of the Freightliner Business Class M2 medium-duty conventional.

Body manufacturers
As a bus chassis, the C2 is only used by Thomas Built Buses as the basis for the Thomas Saf-T-Liner C2.  As Thomas is a subsidiary of Freightliner, there are no plans by other body manufacturers to utilize the C2 chassis.  However, the standard Freightliner M2 chassis is available to the commercial and shuttle bus industry as a cutaway cab.

Powertrain
Engines - Current Offerings

Engines - Prior Offerings

Transmissions
The C2 comes standard with an Allison 2500 automatic transmission. Also available are Fuller 5-speed manual transmission and the Allison 3000 automatic.

See also

 List of buses
 School Bus
 Thomas Saf-T-Liner C2

References

C2
School bus chassis
Vehicles introduced in 2004